The women's 1500 metres event at the 2013 Summer Universiade was held on 10–12 July.

Medalists

Results

Heats
Qualification: First 4 in each heat (Q) and the next 4 fastest (q) qualified for the final.

Final

References 

1500
2013 in women's athletics
2013